A predator trap is a natural hazard where prey animals become trapped or incapacitated, and the attracted predators suffer the same fate. More predators, scavengers, insects and birds become attracted to this mounting accumulation of carrion, until a wide variety of animals are caught and ultimately killed by the hazard. This may happen many times over. Typically, the number of lured predators will greatly outnumber the prey, thus providing the name.

A famous example is the La Brea Tar Pits site, where predators were attracted to struggling animals that had become entrapped in tar. It has been speculated that the mudstone deposits at the Cleveland-Lloyd Dinosaur Quarry may have been a predator trap, with dinosaurs becoming trapped in mud as they approached the floodpond. The Gobi Desert dinosaur death traps may have been sauropod footprints that have been filled with a mixture of thick mud and sandstone in the former wetland.

The "Valley of Death" near the Kikhpinych volcano in Russia forms a predator trap every spring when it fills with poisonous volcanic gases, initially killing birds which then attract larger predators, which also succumb to the gas.

References

Geological hazards
Predation